DOF ASA was a Norwegian supply shipping company.

Background
Founded in 1981, DOF is a group of international companies operating within the offshore oil and gas service industry. With its main offices in Austevoll, DOF ASA is the holding company for DOF Subsea AS in Norway and NorSkan Offshore Ltda in Brazil.

The company operates 74 offshore vessels. This includes 24 platform supply vessels, 20 anchor handling tug supply vessels and 30 Construction Support vessels (including rescue vessel Skandi Patagonia).

References

External links
 DOF

Shipping companies of Norway
Supply shipping companies
Norwegian companies established in 1981
Companies listed on the Oslo Stock Exchange
Austevoll